The 2005 Danish Figure Skating Championships was held in December 2004. Skaters competed in the disciplines of men's singles and ladies' singles. Not all disciplines were held on all levels due to a lack of participants.

Senior results

Men

Ladies

References

External links
 results

Danish Figure Skating Championships
2004 in figure skating
Danish Figure Skating Championships, 2005
Figure Skating Championships